Marco Venieri or Venier may refer to:
 Marco Venier, Marquess of Cerigo
 Marco Venier, Lord of Cerigo (died 1311)